800 Pound Gorilla Media is an American independent comedy record label founded in Nashville, Tennessee, by Ryan Bitzer & Damion Greiman along with founding members Ian Adkins and Anthony Leo,. The label distributes stand-up comedy albums and video specials worldwide and has close to 300 comics on its roster, including Chad Daniels, Kathleen Madigan, George Lopez, Whitney Cummings, Jim Jeffries, Greg Warren, Michelle Wolf and more.

History 

800 Pound Gorilla was launched in 2016 by comedy managers Ryan Bitzer and Damion Greiman along with founding members Ian Adkins and Anthony Leo, who saw an opportunity to bring modern strategies in consumer targeting, digital marketing and fan engagement to the comedy space. Besides releasing brand new comedy albums through their flagship label, 800 Pound Gorilla Records showcases the legends of comedy through the Clown Jewels imprint and provides distribution services and marketing for Kevin Hart's LOL Network and Bill Burr's All Things Comedy, among other partnerships.

In 2019, 800 Pound Gorilla Media launched a children's music imprint called 8 Pound Gorilla, whose artists include the Imagination Movers, Genevieve Goings, Frances England, and SaulPaul, among others. The company also partnered with Robert Kelly and The Syndicate to form The Laugh Network which consists of a podcast network called The Laugh Button Podcast Network and a record label called The Laugh Button Records. The first release on that label was comedian Mike Feeney's ‘Rage Against the Routine’.

In February of 2019, the founders of 800 Pound Gorilla partnered with former Broadcast Music executive Jim King to found Spoken Giants, a multi-rights organization that helps creators of spoken word copyrights collect royalties on the performance of their works. The company represents hundreds of members, including Patton Oswalt, Jeff Foxworthy, Lewis Black, Dan Cummins, Gerry Dee, Pete Holmes, Kyle Kinane, Kathleen Madigan, the Ralphie May Estate, Leanne Morgan, Theo Von, and hundreds of others.

Notable releases 
 George Lopez – The Wall: Live in Washington D.C.
 Kathleen Madigan – Bothering Jesus
 Jim Jefferies – Freedumb
 Chad Daniels – Dad Chaniels, Twelfth Night
 Greg Warren – Where the Field Corn Grows
 Demetri Martin – Live at the Time
 Iliza Shlesinger – Confirmed Kills
 Jo Koy – Live from Seattle
 Michelle Wolf – Nice Lady
 Marc Maron – Too Real
 Pete Holmes – Dirty Clean
 Kyle Kinane –  Trampoline in a Ditch
 Stephen Lynch - My Old Heart
 Fern Brady – Power & Chaos

See also
 List of record labels
 Comedy Central Records

References

External links
 Official site

American independent record labels
Comedy record labels
Record labels established in 2016
American companies established in 2016
2016 establishments in Tennessee
Companies based in Nashville, Tennessee